Gin Cove is a cove in Antarctica indenting the northwest coast of James Ross Island to the north of Tumbledown Cliffs.

In association with the names of other alcoholic beverages on this coast, named "Gin Cove" by the United Kingdom Antarctic Place-Names Committee (UK-APC) in 1983.

References

Coves of Graham Land
Landforms of James Ross Island